Junk Magic is an album by Craig Taborn, with Aaron Stewart (tenor sax), Mat Maneri (viola), and Dave King (drums). It was released in 2004 by Thirsty Ear Recordings.

Background
The album's title was also the name of the band, which was formed to be Taborn's electronic group, allowing him to explore the interactions of composition, improvisation and electronics. The name came from Sam Shepard's writings.

Recording and music
Taborn produced the album. Texture and pulse were important contributors to the overall sound. The title track contains "skittering beats [...that] layer themselves over off-kilter drum machine pyrotechnics and a looped piano phrase."

Releases
Junk Magic was released on April 20, 2004 by Thirsty Ear Recordings.

Reception
The Penguin Guide to Jazz commented that the album's title "is apposite, since it does resemble something beautiful and even something slightly forbidding created out of the remnants of a throwaway culture". The AllMusic reviewer concluded that "Junk Magic is a stunner from start to finish, and one that challenges the notions and linguistic senses as to what jazz 'is', as well as what it is not." Nate Chinen praised Taborn's work as producer, stating that "What pushes this album into the zone of innovation is his work as a sequencer and producer, which gives the lie to any accusation that 'jazztronica' means jazz musicians superimposing their tunes on synthetic grooves. What Taborn does is infallibly organic, even when he's performing radical reconstructive surgery."

Track listing
All compositions are by Craig Taborn.

"Junk Magic" – 6:18
"Mystero" – 6:55
"Shining Through" – 5:50
"Prismatica" – 3:32
"Bodies at Rest and in Motion" – 7:07
"Stalagmite" – 1:09
"The Golden Age" – 11:07

Personnel
Craig Taborn – piano, keyboards, programming
Aaron Stewart – tenor sax
Mat Maneri – viola
Dave King – drums

References 

2004 albums
Craig Taborn albums